Valérie Létourneau (born April 29, 1983) is a retired Canadian mixed martial artist who competed in the Women's Flyweight and Strawweight divisions for Bellator MMA and Ultimate Fighting Championship (UFC) .

Mixed martial arts career 
Létourneau made her MMA debut March 31, 2007 with TKO win over Tannaya Hantelman. Létourneau then lost her next two fights to future UFC Women's Bantamweights Sarah Kaufman & Alexis Davis. Létourneau broke her hand in the first round of her fight with Davis. After Létourneau rebounded by winning her next three fights she then set to face future UFC Women's Strawweight Cláudia Gadelha at Wreck MMA: Road to Glory. She lost via split decision.

Létourneau returned at AFC 21 finishing off Jordan Moore in 34 seconds via TKO.

The Ultimate Fighter

Létourneau was one of the female contestants competing to get into the TUF house for the TUF 18 season. She lost via rear-naked choke to Roxanne Modafferi.

Ultimate Fighting Championship

Létourneau made her UFC debut at UFC 174 taking on Elizabeth Phillips, who was filling in for the injured Milana Dudieva. Létourneau won the fight via split decision.

Létourneau returned to the octagon to face fellow Canadian Jessica Rakoczy at UFC 186. Létourneau won the bout via unanimous decision.

Létourneau next faced undefeated Maryna Moroz at UFC Fight Night 74. She won via unanimous decision.

Létourneau faced Strawweight champion Joanna Jędrzejczyk on November 15, 2015 in the co-main event at UFC 193. She lost the fight by unanimous decision (49-46, 49-46, 50-45).

Létourneau faced Joanne Calderwood at UFC Fight Night: MacDonald vs. Thompson in the first ever women's flyweight bout in UFC history. She lost the fight via TKO in the third round.

Létourneau faced Viviane Pereira at UFC 206. She lost the fight by a very controversial split decision and was subsequently released from the promotion.

Bellator MMA

On April 24, 2017, Létourneau signed a new contract with Bellator MMA. The deal enabled her to fight at a weight of 125 pounds, an easier weight cut than the 115 pound weight limit required for the UFC's strawweight division.

Létourneau was expected to debut against Emily Ducote at Bellator 181 on July 14, 2017. However, on July 10, she pulled out of the bout due to injury.

Létourneau eventually made her debut against Kate Jackson at Bellator 191 on December 15, 2017. She won the fight by unanimous decision.

Letourneau then faced Kristina Williams at Bellator 201, earning the a unanimous decision victory.

Letourneau faced Ilima-Lei Macfarlane at Bellator 213 for the Bellator Women's Flyweight World Championship. She was defeated by third round submission.

Mixed martial arts record

|-
|Loss
|align=center|10–7
|Ilima-Lei Macfarlane
|Submission (triangle choke)
|Bellator 213
|
|align=center|3
|align=center|3:19
|Honolulu, Hawaii, United States
|
|-
|Win
|align=center|10–6
|Kristina Williams
|Decision (unanimous)
|Bellator 201
|
|align=center|3
|align=center|5:00
|Temecula, California, United States
|
|-
|Win
|align=center|9–6
|Kate Jackson
|Decision (unanimous)
|Bellator 191
|
|align=center|3
|align=center|5:00
|Newcastle, England
|
|-
|Loss
|align=center|8–6
|Viviane Pereira
|Decision (split)
|UFC 206
|
|align=center|3
|align=center|5:00
|Toronto, Ontario, Canada
|
|-
|Loss
|align=center|8–5
|Joanne Calderwood
|TKO (body kick and punches)
|UFC Fight Night: MacDonald vs. Thompson
|
|align=center|3
|align=center|2:51
|Ottawa, Ontario, Canada
|
|-
|Loss
|align=center|8–4
|Joanna Jędrzejczyk
|Decision (unanimous)
|UFC 193
|
|align=center|5
|align=center|5:00
|Melbourne, Australia
|
|-
|Win
|align=center|8–3
|Maryna Moroz
|Decision (unanimous)
|UFC Fight Night: Holloway vs. Oliveira
|
|align=center|3
|align=center|5:00
|Saskatoon, Saskatchewan, Canada
|
|-
|Win
|align=center|7–3
|Jessica Rakoczy
|Decision (unanimous)
|UFC 186
|April 25, 2015
|align=center|3
|align=center|5:00
|Montreal, Quebec, Canada
|
|-
|Win
|align=center|6–3
|Elizabeth Phillips
|Decision (split)
|UFC 174
|June 14, 2014
|align=center|3
|align=center|5:00
|Vancouver, British Columbia, Canada
|
|-
|Win
|align=center|5–3
|Jordan Moore
|TKO (punches)
|AFC 21 - The Return
|May 16, 2014
|align=center|1
|align=center|0:34
|Hollywood, Florida, United States
|
|-
|Loss
|align=center|4–3
|Cláudia Gadelha
|Decision (split)
|Wreck MMA - Road to Glory
|April 20, 2012
|align=center|3
|align=center|5:00
|Gatineau, Quebec, Canada
|
|-
|Win
|align=center|4–2
|Tannaya Hantelman
|TKO (punches)
|Freedom Fight - For Honor and Pride
|September 10, 2011
|align=center|1
|align=center|2:07
|Sudbury, Ontario, Canada
|
|-
|Win
|align=center|3–2
|Julie Malenfant
|TKO (punches)
|Ringside MMA 10 - Cote vs. Starnes
|April 9, 2011
|align=center|2
|align=center|2:15
|Montreal, Quebec, Canada
|
|-
| Win
|align=center| 2–2
| Kate Roy
| Submission (armbar)
|XMMA 7 - Inferno
|February 27, 2009
|align=center|1
|align=center|3:23
|Montreal, Quebec, Canada
|
|-
| Loss
|align=center| 1–2
| Alexis Davis
| Decision (split)
| TKO 31 - Young Guns
|December 14, 2007
|align=center|3
|align=center|5:00
|Montreal, Quebec, Canada
|
|-
| Loss
|align=center| 1–1
| Sarah Kaufman
| TKO (punches)
| TKO 29 - Repercussion
|June 1, 2007
|align=center|2
|align=center|1:36
|Montreal, Quebec, Canada
|
|-
| Win
|align=center| 1–0
| Tannaya Hantelman
| TKO (punches)
|ECC 5 - A Night Of Champions
|March 31, 2007
|align=center|2
|align=center|4:02
|Halifax, Nova Scotia, Canada
|
|-

|-
|Loss
|align=center|0–1
|Roxanne Modafferi
|Submission (rear-naked choke) 
|The Ultimate Fighter: Team Rousey vs. Team Tate
| (air date)
|align=center|1
|align=center|3:36
|Las Vegas, Nevada, United States
|

See also
 List of female mixed martial artists
 List of Canadian UFC fighters

References

External links
 
 Valerie Letourneau at Bellator (archived)
 

1983 births
Living people
Canadian female mixed martial artists
Strawweight mixed martial artists
Bantamweight mixed martial artists
Mixed martial artists utilizing boxing
Bellator female fighters
Canadian practitioners of Brazilian jiu-jitsu
Female Brazilian jiu-jitsu practitioners
French Quebecers
Sportspeople from Montreal
People from Coconut Creek, Florida
Ultimate Fighting Championship female fighters